Philip Baker Hall  (September 10, 1931 – June 12, 2022) was an American character actor.

Hall is known for his collaborations with Paul Thomas Anderson, including Hard Eight (1996), Boogie Nights (1997), and Magnolia (1999). He also starred in leading roles in films, such as Secret Honor (1984) and Duck (2005). Hall had supporting roles in many films, including Say Anything... (1989), The Truman Show (1998), The Talented Mr. Ripley (1999), The Insider (1999), Lost Souls (2000), The Contender (2000), Bruce Almighty (2003), Dogville (2003), Zodiac (2007), 50/50 (2011), and Argo (2012). He received an Independent Spirit Award nomination for Best Male Lead for his role in Hard Eight and two Screen Actors Guild Award nominations for Outstanding Performance by an Ensemble Cast in a Motion Picture for Boogie Nights and Magnolia.

Hall is also known for his prolific work on television. His early television work included M*A*S*H, Murder, She Wrote, and Cheers. One of his most memorable television roles was as Lt. Joe Bookman, the "Library cop", in Seinfeld. He had recurring roles in The Practice, The West Wing, Curb Your Enthusiasm, Modern Family, and BoJack Horseman.

Early life
Hall was born in Toledo, Ohio. His mother was Alice Birdene (née McDonald), and his father, William Alexander Hall, was a factory worker from Montgomery, Alabama. He attended the University of Toledo. He served in Germany as a United States Army translator and as a high school teacher.

Career
After his film debut Cowards, he joined the Los Angeles Theatre Center. His first television role came for an episode of Good Times. Hall guest starred in episodes of M*A*S*H and Man from Atlantis. He had over 200 guest roles since 1977. He played Richard Nixon in the one-character film Secret Honor and reprised his role he had created during the play's original Off-Broadway run. Roger Ebert said about Hall and the film: "Nixon is portrayed by Philip Baker Hall, an actor previously unknown to me, with such savage intensity, such passion, such venom, such scandal, that we cannot turn away. Hall looks a little like the real Nixon; he could be a cousin, and he sounds a little like him. That's close enough. This is not an impersonation, it's a performance." Vincent Canby of The New York Times also said about Hall: "Mr. Hall's immense performance, which is as astonishing and risky – for the chances the actor takes and survives – as that of the Oscar-winning F. Murray Abraham in Amadeus."

In the 1980s, Hall co-starred in various films in supporting roles, including Nothing in Common (1986), Midnight Run (1988), Say Anything... and Ghostbusters II (both 1989). He played "Lt. Joe Bookman", a detective pursuing a long-overdue library book in the Seinfeld episodes, "The Library" and "The Finale". His first Seinfeld appearance led him to be widely lauded as one of the best guest stars on the series, and led to many other jobs.

Hall starred in Paul Thomas Anderson's short film Cigarettes & Coffee, which was adapted into Anderson's directorial debut film Hard Eight (1996). For the film, Hall played a senior gambler who mentors a homeless man (John C. Reilly). Ebert of the Chicago Sun-Times said about Hall, "Here is another great performance. He is a man who has been around, who knows casinos and gambling, who finds himself attached to three people he could easily have avoided, who thinks before he acts." Hall was nominated for the Independent Spirit Award for Best Male Lead. He later starred in Anderson's other films, Boogie Nights (1997) and Magnolia (1999). He was nominated for two Screen Actors Guild Awards for Outstanding Performance by a Cast in a Motion Picture. Hall starred with Philip Seymour Hoffman in four films.

Hall had turns in a variety of films in the 1990s, including The Rock, The Truman Show, The Talented Mr. Ripley, and The Insider. He co-starred in other films in the 2000s, including Dogville, Zodiac, and Argo. He played Captain Diel in the Rush Hour trilogy (though his scenes were cut from Rush Hour 2 and he was uncredited for the scene in Rush Hour 3). Hall had prominent roles in Bruce Almighty, In Good Company, The Amityville Horror, The Matador, You Kill Me, All Good Things, 50/50, and The Sum of All Fears.

Hall starred in the sitcom The Loop. He guest starred in the animated series The Life & Times of Tim. He played a physician in Curb Your Enthusiasm, and appeared in Modern Family. He appeared in an episode of The Newsroom and in a Holiday Inn commercial. For the short film Dear Chickens, he won best actor at Los Angeles Short Festival and at Filmets Badalona Film Festival in Barcelona.

Hall also undertook stage work in New York and Los Angeles, but did not appear on Broadway.

Personal life and death
Hall had two daughters, Patricia and Darcy, with his first wife, Mary-Ella Holst. He later married Holly Wolfle, with whom he had two daughters, Adella and Anna. He also had four grandchildren and a brother.

Hall died of emphysema at his home in Glendale, California, on June 12, 2022.

Filmography

Film

Television

Accolades

References

External links
 
 

1931 births
2022 deaths
20th-century American male actors
21st-century American male actors
American male film actors
American male stage actors
American male television actors
Respiratory disease deaths in California
Deaths from emphysema
Male actors from Toledo, Ohio
Military personnel from Ohio
University of Toledo alumni